Cherublemma emmelas, the black brotula, is a species of cusk-eel found along the Pacific coast of Central and South America from Baja California to Chile. This species grows to a length of  SL. It is the only known member of its genus. Many have been found living close to either soft sediments or rocky bottoms in the broad oxygen minimum zone of the Gulf of California, where by unknown means they thrive in conditions with partial pressures of oxygen ranging from 0.1 to 0.15 kPa, which had formerly been assumed to be lethal for any species of fish.

References

Ophidiidae
Monotypic fish genera
Fish described in 1890